Montgomery Blair (May 10, 1813 – July 27, 1883) was an American politician and lawyer from Maryland. He served in the Lincoln administration cabinet as Postmaster-General from 1861 to 1864, during the Civil War. He was the son of Francis Preston Blair, elder brother of Francis Preston Blair Jr. and cousin of B. Gratz Brown.

Early life and education
Blair was born in Franklin County, Kentucky, site of the state capital of Frankfort. His father, Francis Preston Blair, Sr., was editor of the Washington Globe and a prominent figure in the Democratic Party during the Jacksonian era. As a boy, Montgomery "often listened to the talk of his father and Andrew Jackson."

Blair graduated from the United States Military Academy in 1835, but after a year's service in the Seminole War, he left the Army, married Caroline Rebecca Buckner of Virginia, and began studying law at Transylvania University in Lexington, Kentucky. Blair began to practice law in 1839 at St Louis, Missouri, working as a United States district attorney. After the death of his first wife, Carolina, in 1844, he later married Mary Elizabeth Woodbury, daughter of Levi Woodbury.

After serving as United States district attorney (1839–43) and later as judge of the court of common pleas (1843–1849), Blair moved to Maryland in 1852 and devoted himself to law practice principally in the United States Supreme Court. He was United States Solicitor in the Court of Claims (1855–58) and was associated with George T. Curtis as counsel for the plaintiff in the Dred Scott v. Sandford case of 1857.

Career 

The Blairs, like many other nationalist Democrats, but unusual for politicians from the border states, had abandoned the Democratic Party in the wake of the Kansas–Nebraska Act and had been among the founding leaders of the new Republican Party. Four years after Blair switched political parties, President Buchanan removed Blair from his position as Solicitor of the United States Court of Claims in 1858. In 1860, Blair took an active part in the presidential campaign on behalf of Abraham Lincoln. After his election, Lincoln appointed Blair to his cabinet as Postmaster General in 1861. Lincoln expected Blair, who advocated taking a firm stance with the southern states, to help balance more conciliatory members of his cabinet. While Postmaster-General, Blair instituted a uniform rate of postage and free delivery in cities. Blair also began the sale of money orders by post offices to reduce the mailing of currency to reduce post office robberies. He also called for the First International Postal Conference, which was held in Paris in 1863 and began the process that led to the Universal Postal Union.

While the Blairs, as a family, were often characterized as conservative on the issue of slavery, Blair notably served as the defense counsel for Dred Scott when the enslaved African-American took his case to the Supreme Court in 1857. Scott was the slave of an Army doctor,  who had taken his enslaved servant along for prolonged stays in free territory.  On Scott's behalf, Blair argued that the time the black man had spent in the free state of Illinois and in Minnesota, free territory since the Northwest Ordinance of 1787, made him a free man. The ruling by Court's majority against Scott's right to freedom is often cited as one of the contributing causes of the Civil War. Writing for the majority, Chief Justice Roger Taney affirmed that the black man had no rights "that the white man was bound to respect" and that black slaves could not be considered American citizens despite having been born in the U.S. This landmark decision was denounced as a step toward the "nationalization" of slavery by Lincoln and others opposed to the expansion of that institution. Conservative as he may have been on other aspects of the slavery issue, Blair's work in the case of Dred Scott vs. Sandford suggests a willingness to embrace more progressive viewpoints.

Blair served as Postmaster-General from 1861 until September 1864, when Lincoln accepted an earlier offer by Blair to resign. Lincoln's action may have been a response to the hostility of the Radical Republican faction, which stipulated that Blair's retirement should follow the withdrawal of John C. Frémont as a candidate for President in that year. Regarding Lincoln's action, Blair told his wife that the president had acted "from the best motives" and that "it is for the best all around." After he left the cabinet, Blair still campaigned for Lincoln's re-election and Lincoln and the Blair family retained close ties.

Under Blair's administration, such reforms and improvements as the establishment of free city delivery; the adoption of a money order system; and the use of railway mail cars were instituted, the last of which had been suggested by George B. Armstrong (d. 1871), of Chicago, general superintendent of the United States railway mail service from 1860 to his death.

Differing from the Republican Party on the Reconstruction policy, Blair gave his adherence to the Democratic Party after the Civil War, along with his brother, who was the Democratic vice presidential candidate in 1868.

In 1876, Blair, along with Matthew H. Carpenter and Jeremiah S. Black, was counsel to Secretary of War William W. Belknap during the House of Representatives investigation into the Trader post scandal. Blair asked the House Investigation Committee chaired by Hiester Clymer to drop the charges against Belknap if the latter resigned office. Clymer, however, declined Blair's offer. Belknap was impeached by the House of Representatives for receiving illicit payments from the Fort Sill trader post on the Western frontier while Secretary of War. Belknap had been given sole power by Congress to choose sutlers to operate lucrative trader posts that sold supplies to U.S. soldiers and Indians. Belknap resigned over the scandal and was acquitted in a Senate trial during the summer of 1876. Many senators did not believe that Congress could convict a private citizen, but the Senate passed a resolution that stated Congress could convict a private citizen.

In 1882, Blair unsuccessfully ran for U.S. Representative from Maryland's sixth district.

Later life and death

His  manor in present-day Silver Spring, Maryland was named Falkland. It was burned by Confederate troops during their thrust towards Washington, D.C. After several years afflicted with "inflammation of the spinal membranes," he died at Silver Spring on July 27, 1883. The funeral services were held at Rock Creek Church, and he was buried at Rock Creek Cemetery. In memory of Blair, the United States Post Office closed on July 30, 1883.

Personal life
Blair's wife was Mary Woodbury, a daughter of Levi Woodbury. Together, they had one daughter, Minnie Blair. They had three sons, Woodbury Blair, Gist Blair, and Montgomery Blair Jr., all of whom were attorneys.

Montgomery Blair and Mary Woodbury Blair were the great-grandparents of actor Montgomery Clift.

In popular culture
Blair is portrayed by actor Lew Temple in the 2012 film Saving Lincoln.
In the 2012 film Lincoln, Blair is inaccurately portrayed by actor Byron Jennings. In the film, Blair is incorrectly depicted as not being in favor of the 13th Amendment, referring to it as "rash and dangerous." In reality, though Blair began the Civil War more concerned with punishing secessionists and restoring the union than abolishing slavery, he accepted the abolition of slavery as necessary (despite his dislike of abolitionists) by 1863.
To commemorate the centennial of the First International Postal Conference, Blair's portrait appeared on a U.S. airmail stamp, Scott catalogue C66, issued in 1963.

Works
 Speech on the Causes of the Rebellion (1864)

Legacy
Montgomery Blair High School in Silver Spring, Maryland is named after Blair.

Gallery

Notes

References
 
 
 Goodwin, D. K. Team of Rivals: The Political Genius of Abraham Lincoln. New York: Simon & Schuster, 2005.  (electronic edition).

Further reading
 Davis, Madison. The Public Career of Montgomery Blair: particularly with reference to his services as Postmaster General of the United States. Washington, D.C.: Columbia Historical Society, 1910
 Moroney, Rita Lloyd. 	Montgomery Blair, Postmaster General. Washington, D.C.: U.S. Government Printing Office, 1963 44p.

External links
Biography
Mr. Lincoln and Friends: Montgomery Blair
Mr. Lincoln and Freedom: Montgomery Blair
Mr. Lincoln's White House: Montgomery Blair

1813 births
1883 deaths
People from Franklin County, Kentucky
United States Military Academy alumni
American people of the Seminole Wars
Maryland state court judges
United States Attorneys for the District of Missouri
United States Postmasters General
American political writers
American male non-fiction writers
People of Maryland in the American Civil War
Union (American Civil War) political leaders
Burials at Rock Creek Cemetery
Maryland Democrats
Maryland Republicans
Lincoln administration cabinet members
19th-century American politicians
Missouri Democrats
19th-century American judges
Deaths from meningitis
Neurological disease deaths in Maryland
Blair family
People from Silver Spring, Maryland